Jan Conny Torstensson (born 28 August 1949) is a Swedish former professional footballer who played as a midfielder or forward. He represented Åtvidabergs FF, Bayern Munich, and FC Zürich during a career that spanned between 1967 and 1980. A full international between 1972 and 1979, he won 40 caps and scored seven goals for the Sweden national team and represented his country at the 1974 and 1978 editions of the FIFA World Cup.

Club career

Åtvidabergs FF 
Torstensson commenced his career with Åtvidabergs FF in southern Sweden, then a club renowned for its successful youth development. From 1967 onward he featured regularly in the senior team with which he ascended to the first division after the first season. In the following years he was part of the team that defined the golden era of the club, winning the only titles in its history. 1970 and 1971 Åtvidabergs FF won the cup and was twice runner up in the championship, which the club won in 1972 and 1973. In 1973 the club also reached the cup final once more.

In the first round of the 1973–74 European Champions Cup campaign Åtvidabergs FF encountered Bayern Munich, with stars like Franz Beckenbauer and Gerd Müller one of the favourites of the competition. In Munich Åtvidaberg lost 1–3, With the aid of two goals by Torstensson, who already scored in Munich, the Swedes achieved the same result in the return leg, albeit losing in the ensuing penalty shoot-out. However, Torstensson impressed the coach and management of Bayern and was speedily transferred for a then impressive sum of 580.000 Marks (290.000 Euros).

Bayern Munich 
Until 1977 he played in 81 Bundesliga matches for Bayern scoring 11 goals. He impressed most in European Cup matches, where he scored a number of important goals, and won the competition three times consecutively between 1974 and 1976, featuring in the finals of 1974 and 1975. Altogether, he scored 10 goals in 21 European cup matches. A further highlight was the winning of the Intercontinental Cup in the two finals against Cruzeiro EC of Brazil.

Later career 
On club level Torstensson moved 1977 to FC Zürich in Switzerland, returning a year later to Åtvidabergs FF, where he ended his career in 1980.

International career 
Torstensson himself debuted 1972 in the Swedish national football team. 1974 he participated with Sweden in the World Cup in Germany, reaching the second phase of the tournament, where he scored the winner against Yugoslavia. Four years later he also participated in the World Cup in Argentina. Sweden exited there winless after round one.

Personal life 
After his playing years he initially had a position in the packaging industry. Over the years he held various functions at Åtvidabergs FF. In 1986, he coached the club in the second division. Later he was manager with the speedway team – speedway is counted amongst the major sports in Sweden – of Västervik, which in those years became runner-up in the national championship.

In 2015, he lived with his wife Annette, a teacher and local politician with the Centerpartiet at a lake in Borghult, a rural location ca. 25 km north-west of Västervik. The couple has been married since 1971 and has two daughters.

Career statistics

International 

 Scores and results list Sweden's goal tally first, score column indicates score after each Torstensson goal.

Honours 
Åtvidabergs FF
 Allsvenskan: 1972, 1973
 Svenska Cupen: 1969–70, 1970–71

Bayern Munich
 Intercontinental Cup: 1976
 European Cup: 1973–74, 1974–75, 1975–76
 Bundesliga: 1973–74
Sweden

 Nordic Football Championship: 1972–77

Individual

 Stor Grabb: 1973
 SvFF Hall of Fame: 2020
 Nordic Football Championship top scorer: 1972–77

References

External links

 Gerhard Fischer: Mr. Europacup aus Åtvidaberg: Mit Holzschuhen auf der Ersatzbank, Süddeutsche Zeitung, 11 September 2015.

Swedish footballers
1949 births
Living people
Expatriate footballers in West Germany
Expatriate footballers in Switzerland
FC Bayern Munich footballers
Sweden international footballers
Swedish expatriate sportspeople in West Germany
Swedish expatriate sportspeople in Switzerland
1974 FIFA World Cup players
1978 FIFA World Cup players
Åtvidabergs FF players
FC Zürich players
Bundesliga players
Swedish football managers
Åtvidabergs FF managers
Association football forwards
Association football midfielders
UEFA Champions League winning players
People from Borgholm Municipality
Sportspeople from Kalmar County